Lilia Ulcida Paredes Navarro (born 23 April 1973) is a Peruvian teacher who was the first lady of Peru from 28 July 2021 to 7 December 2022 and the wife of President Pedro Castillo. She and her children are evangelicals, while her husband is a Catholic.

Biography 
Lilia Paredes was born on April 23, 1973 in Tacabamba, a town in the province of Chota that belongs to the Cajamarca.

In addition to being a rural teacher with a bachelor's degree in education and a master's degree in Educational Psychology from the César Vallejo University, Paredes is also a weaver, artisan and rancher.

In 2000, Paredes married teacher Pedro Castillo, her partner since adolescence and with whom she already had two children, Arnol and Alondra. She also has a putative child, Yenifer, her younger sister, who was raised as another daughter by the couple upon the death of her mother.

She belongs to the Christian Church of the Nazarene, an evangelical congregation.

Before assuming the position of first lady and moving to Lima, Paredes lived in the town of Chugur, in the district of Anguía.

References 

1973 births
Living people
First Ladies of Peru
Peruvian evangelicals
Peruvian schoolteachers
21st-century Peruvian women
21st-century women educators
César Vallejo University alumni